Friedrich Horschelt (14 April 1793, Cologne - 9 December 1876, Munich) was a German ballet master and impresario.

Biography
He was the son of a ballet master. In 1805, after his father's death, his mother took him and his three sisters on a tour and, in 1806, settled in Vienna. From 1811, he was a dancer and choreographer at the Leopoldstädter Theater. Three years later, he became the assistant to the ballet master at the Theater an der Wien.

In 1815, he created a children's ballet company there, with financial support from Ferdinánd Pálffy, the theater's manager. He directed the company until 1821, when he relocated to Munich to take an appointment as Court Ballet Master. Some believed that Horschelt left Vienna because he was aware of the abuse.

He held the court position until 1829, when his new company began to suffer financial difficulties, and was eventually dissolved. After that, he went on a tour with his wife, Babette Eckner (1804-1889), who was also a dancer; giving guest performances in Vienna, Stuttgart and Milan. In 1837, he was invited back to Munich. He became blind in 1848, and was forced to retire.   

His sons, Theodor and Friedrich, both became painters. The former specialized in battle scenes and the latter in portraits. His son, August (1830-1887), followed in his father's footsteps as a dancer.

Sources

External links 
 Excerpt from Ballet in Western Culture by Carol Lee @ Google Books
 Portrait of his wife, Babette @ Meisterdrücke

1793 births
1876 deaths
German choreographers

19th-century German ballet dancers
Ballet masters
Impresarios
People from Cologne